Home Place is a 1990 book written by Crescent Dragonwagon and illustrated by Jerry Pinkney about a family who comes across the remains of a homestead and a girl who imagines what that family was like.

Reception
Publishers Weekly, in a review of Home Place,  wrote "With striking craft, Dragonwagon limns a forgotten family's day-to-day existence. Pinkney's characteristically stunning, limpid watercolors are lush in shades of greens and browns, with touches of vibrant yellow in the flowers." and School Library Journal called it " A wonderfully evocative work."

Home Place has also been reviewed by Booklist, and Kirkus Reviews

It received the 1991 Golden Kite Picture book Award.

References

1990 children's books
American picture books
Picture books by Jerry Pinkney